Ishma-Dagan (Ish-ma-Dda-gan, c. 2190-2146 BCE) was a ruler of the city of Mari, one of the military governors known as Shakkanakku in northern Mesopotamia, in the later period of the Akkadian Empire. According to the dynastic lists, he ruled for 45 years, after Shu-Dagan, and was the third Shakkanakku ruler. Ishma-Dagan was probably contemporary with the Akkadian Empire ruler Shar-Kali-Sharri. He had two sons who succeeded him in turn as Shakkanakkus of Mari: Nûr-Mêr and Ishtup-Ilum.

He is also known from inscriptions by his son Ishtup-Ilum mentioning his father, in dedication tablets for the building of a temple:

References

22nd-century BC rulers
Kings of Mari
22nd-century BC people